The Tottenham & Forest Gate Railway was a railway line in north London, formed by an Act of Parliament of 1890 and built as joint venture between the Midland Railway and the London, Tilbury and Southend Railway.  It officially opened on 1 July 1894 with passenger serviced commencing 8 days later and was taken over entirely by the Midland Railway in 1912.

History

The line was authorised at the request of Sir Courtenay Warner, a property developer who owned land in Walthamstow, in order to serve the new developments there.  Much of the route crossed many existing roads, and the area had already been extensively built on, so the line was built on top of a long brick viaduct.  Many houses were demolished to make way and there was considerable local opposition to the railway.

The line opened to passengerson 9 July 1894 between South Tottenham and Woodgrange Park where it joined the existing LTSR line to Barking and beyond.  On the same date a curve was opened allowing East Ham to be served as an alternative to Barking.  Trains did not terminate at South Tottenham but continued westwards to various destinations via the Tottenham & Hampstead Junction Railway, much as the Gospel Oak to Barking Line does today.

Stations

The line had the following stations (listed from west to east using the original station names):

 South Tottenham & Stamford Hill (existing)
 Blackhorse Road (new)
 Walthamstow (new)
 Leyton (new)
 Leytonstone (new)
 Wanstead Park (new)
 Woodgrange Park (new)
 Branch: East Ham (new, line abandoned 1958)
 Barking (existing)

Current status

The line now forms part of the Gospel Oak to Barking line, part of the London Overground.

References

External links
 History of the Barking to Gospel Oak line
 A Brief History of Forest Gate

History of rail transport in London
London, Midland and Scottish Railway constituents
Railway lines opened in 1894